Balticconnector is a bi-directional natural gas pipeline between Ingå, Finland and Paldiski, Estonia. It connects Estonian and Finnish gas grids. The pipeline provides Finland with access to the Latvian natural gas storage facility at Inčukalns. In addition, the pipeline enables construction of the regional liquefied natural gas terminal.

History
The project was proposed originally by the Finnish natural gas company Gasum in cooperation with Eesti Gaas of Estonia. After implementation of the EU third energy package, EG Võrguteenus, a former subsidiary of Eesti Gaas, replaced the latter. Later EG Võrguteenus was acquired by, and became a part of the Estonian transmission system operator Elering. In October 2015, Gasum abandoned the project due to commercial viability. It was replaced by the Finnish state-owned company Baltic Connector OY.

The feasibility study was completed in May 2007. A preliminary environmental impact assessment programme was done in 2010. In 2010, the European Commission financed the investigation of possibilities to create more diversified natural gas grid within the Baltic Sea Region, which included also the Balticconnector project. The seabed studies started in November 2013.

The construction agreement was signed between Elering and Baltic Connector on 17 October 2016. The cornerstone of the pipeline was laid on 8 June 2018 in Ingå. The ceremony was attended by Minister of Economic Affairs and Infrastructure of Estonia Kadri Simson, Minister of the Environment and Energy of Finland Kimmo Tiilikainen, European Commission member Jyrki Katainen and the managers of Elering and Baltic Connector Oy. Laying the offshore pipeline started on 20 May 2019 and was completed on 24 June 2019. Shielding of the offshore section were completed by 12 July 2019.

The onshore section in Estonia was filled with gas on 23 October 2019 and the offshore section was filled with gas on 27 November 2019. The pipeline was inaugurated on 11 December 2019 by ceremonies in Helsinki and Paldiski. The ceremonies were attended by presidents of Estonia and Finland Kersti Kaljulaid and Sauli Niinistö, ministers of economy Taavi Aas and Mika Lintilä, Deputy Director-General of European Commission Energy Directorate Klaus-Dieter Borchardt and the managers of Elering and Baltic Connector Oy.

Balticconnector started commercial operations on 1 January 2020. During the first month of operation it supplied over a third of Finnish gas demand, 885 GWh. By comparison, the domestic Estonian consumption was 565 GWh.

After the commissioning of a gas interconnection between Poland and Lithuania in 2022, Estonia and, via the Balticconnector, Finland have been connected to the Polish and internal EU gas markets.

Technical description
It consists of metering and compressor stations in Ingå and in Kersalu, Estonia. The offshore part is operated jointly by Elering and Baltic Connector, while onshore sections of the pipeline will be developed separately by each party.

In Estonia the pipeline is connected to the existing  transmission pipeline from Latvia, which will be enhanced. The pipeline costs €300 million, of which 206 million were financed by the European Commission.

Onshore section in Estonia was built by EG Ehitus AS, a subsidiary of Eesti Gaas, and the offshore section was built by Allseas. The offshore pipeline was laid by the pipe-laying vessel Lorelay. Pipes were supplied by Corinth Pipeworks Pipe Industry SA.

See also

 Energy in Estonia

References

External links
 Balticconnector (Elering website)
 Balticconnector (Baltic Connector Oy website)

Natural gas pipelines in Finland
Natural gas pipelines in Estonia
Pipelines under the Baltic Sea
Estonia–Finland relations
2019 establishments in Estonia
2019 establishments in Finland